Lal Mai is a Pakistani horror drama series premiered on Aaj Entertainment on 12 December 2019. It has Taqi Ahmed, Shamil Khan, Hira Soomro and Sana Fakhar in pivotal roles.

The shooting of the serial took place in Balakot region of North Pakistan.

Plot 
The story revolves around an unborn child (child of devil) who comes back in the lives of Nauman, Seema and Mannat to take revenge, the revenge of the mistake which has not even committed. The devil's journey starts from mountains and then reaches to cities and makes fuss there.

Cast 
Taqi Ahmed as Nauman
Shamil Khan as Khan Jee
Sana Fakhar as Lal Mai
Hira Soomro as Seema Nauman
Malik Raza as Zaman
Saleem Mairaj as Moosa
Tariq Jameel as Malik Sahab
Tasleem Ansari as Zubaida
Khwaja Saleem as Siraj
Faryal Noshad as Shehla
Angel Kainat as Mannat
Faraz Faheem as Noman
Saba Shah as Gul Bano
Rohail Khan
Samiullah
Mohsin Waheed

References 

 
2019 Pakistani television series debuts
Urdu-language television shows
Pakistani horror fiction television series